Lubbeek is a municipality located in the Belgian province of Flemish Brabant. The municipality comprises the towns of Binkom, Linden, Lubbeek proper and Pellenberg. On January 1, 2006, Lubbeek had a total population of 13,660. The total area is 46.13 km² which gives a population density of 296 inhabitants per km².

References

External links
 
Official website - Available only in Dutch

Municipalities of Flemish Brabant